Conus crocatus, common name the saffron cone, is a species of sea snail, a marine gastropod mollusk in the family Conidae, the cone snails and their allies.

Subspecies 
 Conus crocatus pseudomagister (Allary & Cossignani, 2016)
Conus crocatus thailandis  Motta, A.J. da, 1978Accessed through: WoRMS
Like all species within the genus Conus, these snails are predatory and venomous. They are capable of "stinging" humans, therefore live ones should be handled carefully or not at all.
Synonyms
Conus crocatus crocatus Lamarck, J.B.P.A. de, 1810: alternate representation of Conus crocatus Lamarck, 1810
Conus crocatus magister Doiteau, C., 1981 Accessed through: WoRMS: synonym of Conus crocatus Lamarck, 1810

Description
The size of the shell varies between 21 mm and 82 mm.

Distribution
This marine species occurs in the Western Pacific; off Western Thailand; In the Indian Ocean off Madagascar and Mauritius

References

 Doiteau, M., 1981. Conus magister (nomen nudum). Rossiniana 13: 3–5
 Tucker J.K. & Tenorio M.J. (2009) Systematic classification of Recent and fossil conoidean gastropods. Hackenheim: Conchbooks. 296 pp.
 Puillandre N., Duda T.F., Meyer C., Olivera B.M. & Bouchet P. (2015). One, four or 100 genera? A new classification of the cone snails. Journal of Molluscan Studies. 81: 1–23

Gallery

External links
 The Conus Biodiversity website
 Cone Shells – Knights of the Sea
 
 Lectotype in MNHN, Paris

crocatus
Gastropods described in 1810